Mono Band are an Irish electronic rock band created by Cranberries guitarist Noel Hogan. The group, which uses a different lead vocalist for almost every song, first appeared when Hogan's website announced the name of his new project on 9 October 2004. Mono Band's first gig was 13 March 2005 at Dolan's in Limerick. On vocals that night were Richard Walters, Alexandra Hamnede, and Fin Chambers. This was followed by a performance at the 2005 SXSW Festival in Austin, TX on 17 March.

Formation 
The band consists of Noel Hogan and various guest artists on a track-by-track basis.

Mono Band traces its roots back to what was intended to be The Cranberries' sixth studio album. Hogan had been working on tracks when the Cranberries announced their hiatus. Using his home studio, and then at West London's Town House Studios with Matthew Vaughan, Hogan set about exploring more electronic music of various genres. With Hogan writing, recording and producing almost all of the music for each track the moniker 'Mono Band' is rather appropriate. Guest artists include Richard Walters, Marius De Vries, Alexandra Hamnede, Kate Havnevik, Nicolas Leroux, Fin Chambers, Angie Hart, and two fellow Cranberries, Mike Hogan and Fergal Lawler.

In May 2005, Mono Band released their debut EP, Mono Band EP, shortly before releasing their first album, Mono Band.

With the touring that followed the release of their first album it became apparent that the concept of Mono Band did not translate as favourably to touring as it did to studio recording. Not every vocalist was available for every tour date, with usually two of the vocalist performing at any given show. Over the course of touring Richard Walters began to emerge as the primary vocalist. With their touring commitment completed Hogan and Walters decided to work together and formed Arkitekt. As of February 2011 there was no word on any upcoming projects by Mono Band.

Line-up
Noel Hogan - guitar, programming, backing vocals
 various guest artists on a track-by-track basis

Discography

Albums
 Mono Band (2005)

EPs
 "Mono Band EP"
 "Remixes"

Singles
 "Waves"
 "Run Wild"

References

External links 
Monoband.co.uk (archived site)
Gohan Records Hogan's label's site

Irish alternative rock groups
Irish electronic music groups
The Cranberries
Musical groups established in 2004
Musical groups disestablished in 2007
Irish electronic rock musical groups